Sergei Nikolayevich Popkov (born July 28, 1963) is a Russian professional football coach and a former player.

References

External links
  Career stats at KLISF

1963 births
Living people
Soviet footballers
FC Volgar Astrakhan players
Russian football managers
FC Rotor Volgograd managers
Association footballers not categorized by position